Vácha is a Czech masculine surname, its feminine counterpart is Váchová. It may refer to:

Vácha
 Karel Vácha (born 1970), Czech footballer
 Ladislav Vácha (1899–1943), Czech gymnast and Olympic champion
 Lukáš Vácha (born 1989), Czech football midfielder

Váchová
Lucie Váchová (born 1984), Czech beauty pageant
Marcela Váchová (born 1953), Czech artistic gymnast

See also
Wacha

Czech-language surnames